Arthur Ernest Sansom FRCP (13 May 1838 in Corsham – 10 March 1907 in Bournemouth) was an English physician, known for his pioneering research on anaesthesiology, the use of carbolic acid in medicine, and diagnosis of heart disease.

Biography
Sansom was educated at Queenwood College near Stockbridge, Hampshire and then at King's College, London. He wrote one of the first and most practical handbooks on anaesthetics and read a paper Anaesthetics in Obstetric Practice before the Obstetrical Society. In 1869–1870 he emphasized the importance of Pasteur's research, together with some research of his own, in a series a papers he presented to the Medical Society of London. He was consulting physician to the London Hospital and to the North-Eastern Hospital for Children. Sansom was elected a Fellow of the Royal College of Physicians in 1878. He was President of the Medical Society of London for the year 1897.

He was survived by his wife and six children. His burial was at East Finchley Cemetery.

Books

References

1838 births
1907 deaths
Alumni of King's College London
19th-century English medical doctors
20th-century English medical doctors
Fellows of the Royal College of Physicians
People from Corsham
Burials at East Finchley Cemetery